The 1998 San Jose State Spartans football team represented San Jose State University during the 1998 NCAA Division I-A football season as a member of the Western Athletic Conference. The team was led by head coach Dave Baldwin, in his second year as head coach at San Jose State. They played home games at Spartan Stadium in San Jose, California. The Spartans finished the 1998 season with a record of four wins and eight losses (4–8, 3–5 WAC).

Schedule

Game Summaries

at Stanford

Idaho

at No. 22 Oregon

New Mexico

at No. 10 Virginia

Rice

at UTEP

at BYU

Utah

at Hawaii

San Diego State

at Fresno State

Team players in the NFL
The following were selected in the 1999 NFL Draft.

The following finished their college career in 1998, were not drafted, but played in the NFL.

Notes

References

San Jose State
San Jose State Spartans football seasons
San Jose State Spartans football